Divine Oladipo (born 5 October 1998) is a United States based English international athlete. She has represented England at the Commonwealth Games.

Biography
Oladipo was educated at Bexley Grammar School, the University of Connecticut and Ohio State University. She has won two bronze medals in the discus at the 2019 British Athletics Championships and the 2021 British Athletics Championships.

In 2022, she was selected for the women's shot put and the women's discus throw events at the 2022 Commonwealth Games in Birmingham.

References

1998 births
Living people
English female shot putters
British female shot putters
English female discus throwers
British female discus throwers
Commonwealth Games competitors for England
Athletes (track and field) at the 2022 Commonwealth Games